Ronald Patrick was an English professional footballer who played as an outside right.

Career
Pashley began his career with Salts, before joining Bradford City in 1938. He made 1 league appearance for the club, before being released in 1939.

Sources

References

Year of birth missing
Year of death missing
English footballers
Association football outside forwards
Salts F.C. players
Bradford City A.F.C. players
English Football League players